Hayal Pass (el. 4700 m) is a high mountain pass to the north of Shani Peak in the Naltar Valley of northern Pakistan. The pass lies in the west of Naltar Pass.

See also
Naltar Valley

External links
 Northern Pakistan detailed placemarks in Google Earth 

Mountain passes of Gilgit-Baltistan